"I'd Die Without You" is a song by American R&B duo P.M. Dawn, first appearing on the soundtrack of the 1992 film Boomerang, starring Eddie Murphy, and was one of several songs to chart from the album. Later, the song was released on the duo's second album, The Bliss Album...? (1993), as well as on their 2000 greatest hits collection, The Best of P.M. Dawn.

"I'd Die Without You" was released in September 1992 as the third single from the Boomerang soundtrack. It peaked at number three on the US Billboard Hot 100 and number two on the Billboard Mainstream Top 40 and Rhythmic charts in 1992. The Recording Industry Association of America awarded the song a gold certification in November 1992 for selling over 500,000 copies. Internationally, the single peaked at number 10 in Canada and reached the top 50 in Australia, New Zealand and the United Kingdom.

Critical reception
Connie Johnson from Los Angeles Times named "I'd Die Without You" one of the group's "best tracks", noting that it "reveal a gentle, emotional-guy sensitivity". Steve Sutherland from NME wrote, "There's a move tie-in here (Boomerang, the new Eddie Murphy) so there's every chance 'I'd Die Without You' will be a hit. Deserves it, anyway. It's cool. Gossamer, slinky, focused, unfussed — what a treat to hear a song that takes its time and doesn't give a toss for the bpms and the clubs. What a treat to heat an understated vocal." An editor from People Magazine described the song as "soulful" and "exquisite".

Track listings

 US 12-inch single
A1. "I'd Die Without You" (extended Jeep mix) – 4:42
A2. "I'd Die Without You" (remix dub) – 5:10
B1. "I'd Die Without You" (remix instrumental) – 4:15
B2. "I'd Die Without You" (extended remix radio edit) – 4:15

 US CD and cassette single
 "I'd Die Without You" (extended remix radio edit) – 4:15
 "I'd Die Without You" (extended Jeep mix) – 4:42
 "I'd Die Without You" (remix dub) – 5:10
 "I'd Die Without You" (remix instrumental) – 4:15
 "I'd Die Without You" (album version) – 4:11

 US and Canadian cassette single
 "I'd Die Without You" (radio edit)
 "On a Clear Day" (radio edit)

 UK 7-inch and cassette single
 "I'd Die Without You"
 "On a Clear Day" (HEvian mix)

 UK 12-inch single
A1. "I'd Die Without You"
B1. "On a Clear Day" (extended)
B2. "On a Clear Day" (7-inch remix)

 UK and Australian CD single
 "I'd Die Without You"
 "On a Clear Day" (HEvian mix)
 "On a Clear Day" (HEvian club mix)
 "I'd Die Without You" (LP version)

Charts

Weekly charts

Year-end charts

Certifications

Release history

References

1992 singles
1992 songs
Island Records singles
LaFace Records singles
P.M. Dawn songs
Songs written by Attrell Cordes